11/1 may refer to:
November 1 (month-day date notation)
January 11 (day-month date notation)
11 shillings and 1 penny in UK predecimal currency